ROHR2 is a pipe stress analysis CAE system from SIGMA Ingenieurgesellschaft mbH, based in Unna, Germany. The software performs both static and dynamic analysis of complex piping and skeletal structures, and runs on Microsoft Windows platform.

ROHR2 software comes with built in industry standard stress codes; such as ASME B31.1, B31.3, B31.4, B31.5, B31.8, EN 13480, CODETI; along with several GRP pipe codes; as well as nuclear stress codes such as ASME Cl. 1-3, KTA 3201.2, KTA 3211.2.

Name
The brand name comes from the German word "Rohr" (pronounced as “ROAR“) which means "Pipe“.

History

Early years as a MBP product : 1960's to 1989
ROHR2 was created in the late 1960s by the one of the first software companies in Germany, Mathematischer Beratungs- und Programmierungsdienst (MBP), based in Dortmund. ROHR2 first ran on mainframes such as UNIVAC 1, CRAY, and later Prime computer. At the time, the program was command line driven with a proprietary programming language to describe the piping systems and define the various load conditions. The 1987 launched version 26, was released for IBM PC as well as IBM PC compatible systems.

As a EDS / SIGMA  product : 1989 to 2000 
MBP was later taken over by EDS (then a part of General Motors Corp., now part of HP Enterprise Services). In 1989, SIGMA Ingenieurgesellschaft mbH was founded in Dortmund, and the ROHR2 development and support team moved to the new office premises of SIGMA. The graphical user interface was added in 1994 to the product, which allowed the editing of piping systems without the need of mastering the earlier required programming language.

Sigma Ingenieurgesellschaft mbH product : 2000 to present 
From the year 2000 onwards, the complete licensing and sales activities came under the management of SIGMA Ingenieurgesellschaft mbH; which by then evolved into an engineering company specializing in pipe engineering, as well as a software development firm.

The recent developments include new bi-directional interfaces based on open standards for transfer of data with other CAD/CAE products such as - AVEVA PDMS, CADISON, Intergraph's  PDS, Intergraph's SmartPlant, HICAD, MPDS4, Bentley System's AutoPLANT, Autodesk's PLANT3D and other PCF supported software. The integration of ROHR2 into the users workflow is supported by third-party interface products to ensure interoperability - a norm in the present engineering software industry.

Software environment
The ROHR2 program system comes with the following software environments; consisting of ROHR2win - the graphical user interface, the ROHR2 - calculation core, and various additional programs (see : related products).

Calculation basics
The static analysis includes the calculation of static loads of any value, or combination in accordance with the theories of first - and second order for linear and non-linear boundary conditions (friction, support lift).

Additional load conditions can also be applied, such as dynamic loads or harmonic excitation. Furthermore, the dynamic analysis include the calculation of eigenvalues and mode shapes as well as their processing in various modal response methods - for the analysis of, for example, earthquakes and fluid hammer.

A non-linear time history module (ROHR2stoss) allows the analysis of dynamic events in the time domain, while taking into account non-linear components such as snubbers or visco dampers based on the Maxwell model.
An efficient superposition module enables a manifold selection and combination of static and dynamic results.

Related products
ROHR2fesu - Finite Element Analysis of Substructures in ROHR2
ROHR2iso - Creation of isometric drawings in ROHR2
ROHR2stoss - Structural Analysis with Dynamic Loads using Direct Integration
ROHR2nozzle - Analysis of nozzles in piping systems according to API 610, 617, 661, NEMA SM23, DIN EN ISO 5199, 9905, 10437 and others
ROHR2press - Internal pressure analysis of piping components
SINETZ - Steady State Calculation of Flow Distribution, Pressure Drop and Heat Loss in Branched and Intermeshed Piping Networks for compressible and incompressible media
SINETZfluid - Calculation of Flow Distribution and Pressure Drop of incompressible Media in Branched and Intermeshed Piping Networks
PROBAD - Code-based strength calculations of pressure parts.

See also
Pipe Stress analysis

References

External links 
 ROHR2 Homepage English

Structural analysis
Computer-aided design
Computer-aided design software for Windows